Autocharis catalalis is a moth in the family Crambidae. It was described by Viette in 1953. It is found in Madagascar.

References

Moths described in 1953
Odontiinae
Moths of Madagascar